The United States military's Air Force Satellite Communications (AFSATCOM) is a network of ground and space systems to allow rapid dissemination of communications to a worldwide audience.  AFSATCOM's creation was during the height of the Cold War to guarantee that Emergency Action Messages would be received by Strategic Air Command nuclear forces.

Operations
AFSATCOM operations used leased transponders off United States Navy Fleet Satellite Communications (FLTSATCOM) satellites for EAM transmission.

See also
Strategic Automated Command and Control System (SACCS)
Post Attack Command and Control System (PACCS)
Airborne Launch Control System (ALCS)
Ground Wave Emergency Network (GWEN)
Minimum Essential Emergency Communications Network (MEECN)
Survivable Low Frequency Communications System (SLFCS)
Primary Alerting System (PAS)
Strategic Air Command Digital Information Network (SACDIN)

References

United States nuclear command and control